Clovelly is a town and electoral ward in Devon, England.

Clovelly may also refer to:

Places
 Clovelly, Cape Town, a suburb of Cape Town, South Africa
 Clovelly, New South Wales, a suburb of Sydney, Australia
 Clovelly Park, South Australia, a suburb of Adelaide, Australia
 Manor of Clovelly, a historic manor in North Devon, England

Ships
 SS Empire Caicos, the cargo ship SS Clovelly in service from 1962 to 1967
 SS Clovelly (ferry), a steam ferry that operated on Okanagan Lake in British Columbia, Canada
 Clovelly-class fleet tenders, a class of Royal Maritime Auxiliary Service boats

See also
 Clovelly Court, a country house in Clovelly, Devon, England
 Clovelly Dykes, an Iron Age hill fort or earthwork near Clovelly, Devon, England
 Clovelly Trails, a neighbourhood in St. John's, Newfoundland and Labrador, Canada